Stamps is a live album by soprano saxophonist Steve Lacy recorded in Switzerland in 1977 and France in 1978 which was released on the HatHut label in 1979.

Reception

The Allmusic review by Scott Yanow stated "Steve Lacy and his quintet are well featured on this double LP which documents two appearances at European festivals. ... Overall this set gives one a good example of Steve Lacy's late-'70s group and its distinctive music".

Track listing
All compositions by Steve Lacy
 "Existence" – 12:58
 "Ire" – 11:29
 "The Dumps" – 12:00
 "Follies" – 11:11 Additional track on CD reissue
 "Stamps" – 4:52
 "Duckles" – 13:02
 "Wickets" – 11:35
 "The Blinks" – 9:17

Personnel
Steve Lacy – soprano saxophone, Japanese bird whistle
Steve Potts – alto saxophone, soprano saxophone
Irene Aebi – cello, violin, bells, vocals
Kent Carter – bass
Oliver Johnson – drums

References

Steve Lacy (saxophonist) live albums
1979 live albums
Hathut Records live albums
Jazz albums by American artists